Maxates coelataria is a moth of the family Geometridae first described by Francis Walker in 1861. It is found in Sri Lanka and from the Indian subregion to Sundaland.

Margins of wings strongly excavate in the spaces. Broadly pale buff costa of forewings and dark speckles. Caterpillar has greenish cylindrical body with small creamy-pink dorsal triangles, where each triangle contains a dark dot. Head with a bifid capsule. The caterpillar rests with a 45 degree angle to the end of a leaf and stalk. Pupation occurs within a cocoon within a folded leaf. The host plant of the caterpillar is Aporosa species.

Sundaland population is classified as a subspecies - Maxates coelataria trychera Prout, 1933.

References

Moths of Asia
Moths described in 1861